Vladimir Ivanovich Vikulov (July 20, 1946 – August 9, 2013) was an ice hockey player who played in the Soviet Hockey League.

He was born in Moscow, Soviet Union and played for HC CSKA Moscow. Vikulov led the Soviet league in goals in 1971–72, and was top goal scorer at the IIHF World Championships the same year.
He was a Soviet all-star in 1970, 1971, and 1972, and an all-star at the world championships in 1971 and 1972.
Vikulov tied for second in scoring at the 1968 Winter Olympics with 12 points in 7 games. He played in the 1972 Summit Series against NHL all-stars and the 1974 Summit Series against WHA all-stars.
He was inducted into the Russian and Soviet Hockey Hall of Fame in 1967.

Career statistics

Regular season

International

References

External links

 Vladimir Vikulov's profile at Sports Reference.com

1946 births
2013 deaths
Burials in Troyekurovskoye Cemetery
HC CSKA Moscow players
Ice hockey players at the 1968 Winter Olympics
Ice hockey players at the 1972 Winter Olympics
Medalists at the 1968 Winter Olympics
Medalists at the 1972 Winter Olympics
Olympic gold medalists for the Soviet Union
Olympic ice hockey players of the Soviet Union
Olympic medalists in ice hockey
Soviet ice hockey right wingers